Birgit Brock-Utne (born 4 May 1938) is a Norwegian educator and politician.

Personal life
Brock-Utne was born in Oslo on 4 May 1938, to Gerhard Brock-Utne and translator Gertrud Hessenberg. From 1960 to 1973 she was married to judge Bård Gaarder,  and in 1973 she was married to politician and diplomat Gunnar Garbo (1924–2016).

Career
Brock-Utne was professor at the University of Dar-es-Salaam from 1987 to 1992, and professor at the University of Oslo from 1995. Among her books are Kunnskap uten makt from 1980 (with Runa Haukaa), Educating for Peace. A Feminist Perspective from 1985, and En mors tåre. Vi som mister våre barn på veiene from 1986.

References 

1938 births
Living people
Norwegian educationalists
Norwegian feminists
Norwegian expatriates in Tanzania
Academic staff of the University of Dar es Salaam
Academic staff of the University of Oslo
Norwegian non-fiction writers
Norwegian women non-fiction writers